Aleksei Kotishevskiy (born April 4, 1985) is a Russian professional basketball player.

External links
 Eurobasket.com Profile 

1985 births
Living people
Sportspeople from Bishkek
Russian men's basketball players
Russian expatriate basketball people in Serbia
PBC Ural Great players
KK Radnički Kragujevac (2009–2014) players
BC Spartak Saint Petersburg players
BC Enisey players
Shooting guards
Universiade medalists in basketball
Universiade silver medalists for Russia
Medalists at the 2009 Summer Universiade